The EURO STOXX 50 is a stock index of Eurozone stocks designed by STOXX, an index provider owned by Deutsche Börse Group. The index is composed of 50 stocks from 11 countries in the Eurozone.

EURO STOXX 50 represents Eurozone blue-chip companies considered as leaders in their respective sectors. It is made up of fifty of the largest and most liquid stocks. The index futures and options on the EURO STOXX 50, traded on Eurex, are among the most liquid products in Europe and the world.

The EURO STOXX 50 was introduced on 26 February 1998. 

The EURO STOXX 50 Index represents some of the largest companies in the Eurozone in terms of free-float market capitalization.
The index captures about 60% of the free-float market capitalization of the EURO STOXX Total Market Index (TMI), which in turn covers about 95% of the free-float market capitalization of the represented countries.

The EURO STOXX 50 is one of the most liquid indices for the Eurozone.

Historical performance

EURO STOXX 50 was quoted only starting 1998 but its prices were calculated retroactively back to the year 1986. The base value is 1000 points, referenced on 31 December 1991.
The following table shows the end-of-year values of the EURO STOXX 50 index since 1986.

Calculation
The calculation of the indices employ the Laspeyres formula, which measures price changes against a fixed base quantity weight:

where: vcc:FdDF
t = Time the index is computed
n = Number of companies in the index
pit = Price of company (i) at time (t)
sit = Number of shares of company (i) at time (t)
ffit = Free-float factor of company (i) at time (t)
cfit = Weighting cap factor of company (i) at time (t)
xit = Exchange rate from local currency into index currency for company (i) at time (t)
Mt = Free-float market capitalization of the index at time (t)
Dt = Divisor of the index at time (t)

Changes in weights due to corporate actions are distributed proportionally across all index components. The index divisors, which is adjusted to maintain the continuity of the values of the index across changes due to corporate actions, are calculated as follows:

where ΔMCt+1 = The difference between the closing market capitalization of the index and the adjusted closing market capitalization of the index: for companies with corporate actions effective at time (t+1), the free-float market capitalization is calculated with adjusted closing prices, the new number of shares at time (t+1) and the free-float factor at time (t+1) minus the free-float market capitalization calculated with closing prices, number of shares at time (t) and free-float factor at time (t).

Buffers are used to achieve the fixed number of components and to maintain stability of the indices by reducing index composition changes. Selection methodology ensures a stable and up-to-date index composition. Fast-entry and fast-exit rules ensure the index accurately represents the performance of only the biggest and most liquid stocks.

Composition
The composition of EURO STOXX 50 is reviewed annually in September. The index is available in several currency (EUR, USD, CAD, GBP, JPY) and return (Price, Net Return, Gross Return) variant combinations. Calculation takes place every 15 seconds between 09:00 CET and 18:00 CET for the EUR and USD variants of any return type, while the CAD, GBP and JPY variants are available as end-of-day calculation only (18:00 CET). The EURO STOXX 50 Index is derived from the 19 EURO STOXX regional Supersector indices.
, the most countries with most companies represented are France (representing 39.9% of all total assets) and Germany (30.2%).

, Euro Stoxx 50 consists of the following companies:

Stocks per country 
The following table shows the number of stocks (companies) per country as of May 2021:

Use in the financial industry

The EURO STOXX 50 serves as the basis for single sub-indices such as the EURO STOXX 50 ex Financials, which excludes all companies assigned to the ICB code 8000. EURO STOXX 50 is used for as underlying index for other financial products or for performance benchmarking purposes. Additionally, the index serves as an underlying for many strategy indices, such as the EURO STOXX 50 Risk Control Indices.
The index is used as an underlying for  ETFs and derivative financial instruments such as  futures and  options.

See also
STOXX Europe 50 (a similar index not limited to the Eurozone)
S&P Europe 350

References

External links
 EURO STOXX 50 page
 EURO STOXX 50 Fact sheet
 STOXX Index Methodology Guide
 Bloomberg page for SX5E:IND
 Yahoo! Finance page for ^STOXX50E
 Euro Stoxx 50 | Index | 965814 | EU0009658145 | Börse Frankfurt (Frankfurt Stock Exchange)